Vincent Evans (1915–2007) was a British diplomat, lawyer and judge.

Vincent Evans may also refer to:

Vincent Evans (artist) (1896–1976), Welsh artist
Vince Evans (born 1955), former American footballer
Evan Vincent Evans (1851–1934), Welsh journalist

See also
 Evans (surname)